Kung Fu Man also known as Kung Fu Hero is a 2012 Chinese-American Kung Fu film. This film was directed by Yuen Cheung-yan and Ning Ying and produced by Keanu Reeves, and starring Tiger Chen, Jiang Mengjie, Arman Darbo, Chyna Mccoy and Vanessa Branch.

Plot
It tells the story of the Chinese Kung Fu Man Chen Ping who protects a young boy named "Christophe" from his kidnappers.

Cast 
 Tiger Chen as Chen Ping, the Kung Fu Man.
 Jiang Mengjie as Liu Jie, an English teacher in a local school.
 Arman Darbo as Christophe, the boy who was kidnapped.
 Yuen Cheung-yan as Wu San
 Vanessa Branch as the main members of the kidnapping group. 
 Igor Darbo as the main members of the kidnapping group.
 Andre McCoy as the main members of the kidnapping group.
 Lin Shen as Liu Jie's boyfriend.

Production
The film shot the scene in Dali City, Yunnan Province, China.

The film fared poorly at the box office.

References

External links
 

2012 films
American martial arts films
Kung fu films
Chinese martial arts films
2012 action films
2012 martial arts films
2010s English-language films
2010s Mandarin-language films
2010s American films